Rachael Marshall is a former Paralympian athlete from Trinidad and Tobago who competed mainly in category L5 throwing events.

She competed in the 1984 Summer Paralympics in New York City, United States.  There she won a gold medal in the women's javelin throw L5 event, a gold medal in the women's shot put L5 event, a bronze medal in the women's 100 metres freestyle L6 event and finished fourth in the women's discus throw L5 event.

She is the only woman to have competed for Trinidad and Tobago at the Paralympics, and the only athlete to have won Paralympic medals for that country.

See also
 Trinidad and Tobago at the Paralympics

External links

References

Paralympic athletes of Trinidad and Tobago
Paralympic swimmers of Trinidad and Tobago
Athletes (track and field) at the 1984 Summer Paralympics
Swimmers at the 1984 Summer Paralympics
Paralympic gold medalists for Trinidad and Tobago
Paralympic bronze medalists for Trinidad and Tobago
Living people
Medalists at the 1984 Summer Paralympics
Trinidad and Tobago female freestyle swimmers
Trinidad and Tobago javelin throwers
Year of birth missing (living people)
Paralympic medalists in athletics (track and field)
Paralympic medalists in swimming
Trinidad and Tobago shot putters